are Shinto shrines used to honor Japanese people killed in action.

They originated in the Meiji Restoration when it was observed that the concept of honoring war dead was present in the Western world but not in Japan. This was particularly noteworthy with the 1874 Japanese invasion of Taiwan in which only 12 people were enshrined in Yasukuni Shrine.

Yasukuni Shrine was formerly called Tokyo Shokonsha and was a part of a general system across Imperial Japan.

The fundamental principle behind the Shokonsha system is that it is designed to enshrine people as heroes regardless of their status before their deaths.

The Shokonsha system became much more seriously implemented with the Satsuma Rebellion from which 6,959 people were enshrined.

In the 1930s the Gokoku Shrine system was developed with rising militarism to impose more control over the memorialization of war dead.

After the end of World War II the system was privatized, but the Gokoku Shrines and Yasukuni Shrine still exist today and can be seen as continuations of the Shokonsha system.

See also
 State Shinto
 Yasukuni Shrine
 War memorial

References

External links
 櫻山神社

State Shinto